George Richard Mcvane Francois (5 August 1924 – 21 June 2005) was a Ghanaian Supreme Court judge. He has contributed to the development of Ghanaian law through some of his important judgments.

Biography
George Richard Mcvane Francois was the first son of George Francois, a merchant from Tafo. He attended Achimota College prior to studying law in the United Kingdom. He was called to the bar at the Middle Temple on 26 January 1951.

See also
Supreme Court of Ghana
List of judges of the Supreme Court of Ghana

Notes

1924 births
2005 deaths
Alumni of Achimota School
20th-century Ghanaian lawyers
Justices of the Supreme Court of Ghana
Ghanaian expatriates in the United Kingdom